Uffing am Staffelsee (officially, Uffing a.Staffelsee) is a municipality in the district of Garmisch-Partenkirchen, in Bavaria, Germany.  It consists of the two villages of Uffing and Schöffau and is located on Staffelsee, the warmest lake in Germany. The River Ach flows through Uffing.

Names
The name Uffing derives from the personal name Uffo and the possessive suffix -ing.  Other attested historical forms of the name include Vfinga, Uffingen and Üffing.

Transport
The town can be reached by car or by train (Deutsche Bahn). Uffing has its own station on the Munich–Garmisch-Partenkirchen line. The nearest international airport is Munich International Airport.

Economy
Uffing benefits from several shops including a bakery (Mayer-Nett), pharmacy, supermarket (Edeka), butcher, and Frau Bauer's drugstore.

Culture
The parish church is dedicated to St Agatha.

Uffing is home to Europe's only gay Schuhplattler group.

The annual Seefest ("Lake Festival"), held in the first week of August (weather permitting), is a celebration of local music, dancing, and customs.  The event is usually rounded off with a firework display.

Notable people 
 Georg Hans Madelung (1889 in Rostock – 1972 in Uffing), academic and aeronautical engineer

References

External links
 Official site 

Garmisch-Partenkirchen (district)